Events in the year 2019 in Iran.

Incumbents
 Supreme Leader of Iran: Ali Khamenei
 President of Iran: Hassan Rouhani 
 Parliament of Iran: Ali Larijani
 Judiciary System of Iran: Sadeq Larijani (until 7 March), Ebrahim Raisi (since 7 March)

Events

14 January – 2019 Saha Airlines Boeing 707 crash
13 February – 2019 Khash–Zahedan suicide bombing: A suicide bomb attack on a vehicle kills at least 27 Revolutionary Guards in southeastern Iran. It is one of the deadliest terrorist attacks in Iran in years.
2 September — Sahar Khodayari (Esteghlal F.C. girl fan) also known as Blue girl ; sets herself on fire after being arrested for attending a soccer game. She dies a week later in hospital.
10 November - Oil field with an estimated 53 billion barrels of crude discovered in Kuszstan 
Since 15 November - 2019–20 Iranian protests ؛ In Persian: اعتراضات آبان ۱۳۹۸

Sports
2018–19 Persian Gulf Pro League

Deaths

8 January – Khosro Harandi, chess player, the first Iranian International Master (b. 1950).
9 January - Bijan Samandar, Iranian poet and musician. (death announced on this date) (b. 1941)
29 January – Mohammad Nabi Habibi, politician, Mayor of Tehran 1984–1987 (b. 1945).
9 February - Farhad Ebrahimi, Iranian poet and writer. (b. 1935)
21 February - Mohammad Momen, Iranian Faqīh and politician. (b. 1938)
22 February - Yadollah Samareh, Iranian linguist (b. 1932)
20 March - Keyvan Vahdani, Iranian footballer (Paykan), landslide. (b. 1991)
2 April - Jamshid Mashayekhi, Iranian actor (Brick and Mirror, The Fateful Day, Abadan). (b. 1934)
16 April - Ahmad Eghtedari, Iranian teacher, lawyer and writer, complications from lung and kidney deficiencies. (b. 1925)
20 April – Monir Shahroudy Farmanfarmaian, artist (b. 1922).
26 April - Nasser Farbod, Iranian political activist and military officer, Chief of Staff (1979). (b. 1922)
10 June - Alireza Shir Mohammad Ali, Iranian political prisoner, stabbed. (b. 1998)
25 June - Alinaghi Alikhani, 90, Iranian economist and politician, Minister of Economics (1963–1969).
26 June - Morteza Saffari Natanzi, Iranian politician, MP (since 2016), pancreatic cancer. (b. 1956)
6 July - Parviz Jalayer, 79, Iranian weightlifter, Olympic silver medalist (1968) and Asian Games champion (1966). (b. 1939)
8 September — Sahar Khodayari, 29, dies after setting herself on fire.

References

 
2010s in Iran
Years of the 21st century in Iran
Iran
Iran